The men's 50 metre backstroke event at the 2014 Commonwealth Games as part of the swimming programme took place on 26 and 27 July at the Tollcross International Swimming Centre in Glasgow, Scotland.

The medals were presented by Antonio Gopal, President of the Seychelles Olympic and Commonwealth Games Association and the quaichs were presented by Mike Summers, Chairman of the Falkland Islands Overseas Games Association.

Records
Prior to this competition, the existing world and Commonwealth Games records were as follows.

Results

Heats

Semifinals

Final

George Bovell, who qualified in eighth place, pulled out of the final to concentrate on the 50 m freestyle where he finished fifth in the final. He was replaced by the first reserve, Singapore's Quah Zheng Wen.

References

External links

Men's 050 metre backstroke
Commonwealth Games